Melaleuca genialis is a plant in the myrtle family, Myrtaceae, and is endemic to the south-west of Western Australia. It is a rare species, known from one nature reserve. It is similar to Melaleuca tinkeri, mainly differing from it in having hairy leaves and petals. (The leaves of M. tinkeri are glabrous.)

Description
Its branchlets are covered with soft, silky hairs when young but become glabrous with age. They are also covered with soft, silky hairs and have single mid-vein.

The flowers are a shade of pink to purple and are arranged in heads on the ends of branches which continue to grow after flowering. The stamens are arranged in five bundles around the flower, each bundle containing 2 to 5 stamens.

Taxonomy and naming
Melaleuca genialis was first formally described as a new species in 2010 by Brendan Lepschi. The specific epithet (genialis) is from the Latin word meaning "jovial" or "pleasant", referring to "the staff at the Western Australian Herbarium in the 1990s".

Distribution and habitat
Melaleuca genialis has a restricted distribution in a nature reserve near Wagin in the Avon Wheatbelt biogeographic region. It grows in woodland in clay soils.

Conservation status
Melaleuca genialis is listed as "Priority Two" by the Government of Western Australia Department of Parks and Wildlife meaning it may be threatened but is poorly known, only occurring in a few locations.

References

genialis
Myrtales of Australia
Plants described in 2010
Endemic flora of Western Australia